Dexter Janke (born October 4, 1992) is a Canadian football coach who is currently the defensive and special teams coordinator for the Westshore Rebels of the Canadian Junior Football League (CJFL). He played professionally as a defensive back for four years in the Canadian Football League (CFL) with the Calgary Stampeders and Winnipeg Blue Bombers, the latter of which he won a Grey Cup title with in 2019.

He previously played amateur football for the Okanagan Sun and attended the University of Saskatchewan, where he played for the Saskatchewan Huskies as a running back.

Early career 

Janke played high school football at Austin O'Brien Catholic High School for three years as a running back. As a junior, he suffered a torn ACL. Janke made it to the city championships in his final year with the team, but he again tore his ACL in the championship game. He received an offer from the University of Calgary to play college football for the Calgary Dinos as both a running back and defensive back, but elected to play solely as a running back for the Saskatchewan Huskies instead. As a result of his second ACL injury, Janke sat out the 2010 season as a redshirt. In 2011, he rushed for 307 yards and four touchdowns, but Janke was sidelined again the following year with a third ACL injury to the same knee. His third reconstructive knee surgery was successful, and he returned to the Huskies in 2013. In 2013, his final year with the Huskies, Janke rushed for 423 yards and four touchdowns.

Janke left the Huskies and joined the Okanagan Sun of the Canadian Junior Football League in 2014. While switching teams, he also switched to the defensive back position. In his only season with Okanagan, Janke recorded 14 tackles, three interceptions, and a fumble recovery while playing in eight games. He also played as a kick and punt returner, averaging 32.9 yards per kick return and 8.3 yards per punt return.

Professional career

Calgary Stampeders 
At the regional CFL Combine in Edmonton, Janke had the second-fastest 40-yard dash time at 4.57 seconds. He earned an invitation to the national combine in Toronto, where he recorded the fastest shuttle time among defensive backs at 4.25 seconds. Janke was selected in the fifth round of the 2015 CFL Draft by the Calgary Stampeders with the 44th overall pick. After beginning the season on the practice squad, Janke made his CFL debut on July 24, 2015, against the Ottawa Redblacks, where he played primarily on special teams. In the August 1 game against the Montreal Alouettes, he recorded his first tackle, finishing with two special-teams tackles. He was released by the Stampeders on May 4, 2018.

Winnipeg Blue Bombers 
On February 7, 2019, Janke signed with the Winnipeg Blue Bombers. He was released on January 30, 2020.

Coaching career 
On March 9, 2020, it was announced that Janke had been hired as the defensive and special teams coordinator for the Westshore Rebels of the CJFL.

References 

1992 births
Living people
Canadian football running backs
Canadian football defensive backs
Canadian football return specialists
Saskatchewan Huskies football players
Canadian Junior Football League players
Calgary Stampeders players
Players of Canadian football from Alberta
Canadian football people from Edmonton
Winnipeg Blue Bombers players